Morteza Niknejad was an Iranian Shia Twelver who was a member of Islamic Coalition Party. Niknejad was born in 1942 in the south of Tehran in a religious family; he was a religious person since his period of adolescence, too. Morteza passed his primary-school, later on, commenced to work at the market—as a Galesh seller.

Niknejad got acquainted with Reza Saffar-Harandi and Mohammad Bokharaei, and altogether got familiar with Islamic Coalition Party. He was practical supporter of Mohammad-Bokharaei (in assassination of Hassan Ali Mansur, the prime minister of the Shah). Afterwards, he was arrested, and finally was executed by the regime of the Shah on 16 June 1965 beside his three colleagues, namely: Mohammad Bokharaei, Sadeq Amani and Reza Saffar-Harandi, whose accusation was "participation in the assassinating of Hassan Ali Mansur.

See also 
 Fada'iyan-e Islam
 Islamic Coalition Party
 Navvab Safavi
 Mohammad Bokharaei

References 

Executed Iranian people
Iranian prisoners sentenced to death
Islamic Coalition Party politicians
Iranian Islamists
People from Tehran
1942 births
1965 deaths